"A Christmas Memory" is a short story by Truman Capote. Originally published in Mademoiselle magazine in December 1956, it was reprinted in The Selected Writings of Truman Capote in 1963. It was issued in a stand-alone hardcover edition by Random House in 1966, and it has been published in many editions and anthologies since.

The largely autobiographical story, which takes place in the 1930s, describes a period in the lives of the seven-year-old narrator and an elderly woman who is his distant cousin and best friend. The woman was Nanny Faulk, elder sister of the household where Capote's wayward parents deposited him as a young boy.  Nanny, whom everyone called Sook, was thought to be developmentally disabled.  But Capote later wrote a friend, I had an elderly cousin, the woman in my story 'A Christmas Memory,' who was a genius."

The evocative narrative focuses on country life, friendship, and the joy of giving during the Christmas season, and it also gently yet poignantly touches on loneliness and loss.

Now a holiday classic, "A Christmas Memory"  has been broadcast, recorded, filmed, and staged multiple times, in award-winning productions.

Plot

Narrated by an unnamed, seven-year-old boy who is referred to as "Buddy" by his older cousin, "A Christmas Memory" is about the narrator's relationship with his older, unnamed, female cousin, to whom he refers throughout the story only as "my friend."  (In later adaptations, she is called Sook.)  Buddy and his cousin, who is eccentric and childlike, live in a house with other relatives—who are authoritarian and stern—and have a dog named Queenie.

The family is very poor, but Buddy looks forward to Christmas every year nevertheless, and he and his elderly cousin save their pennies for this occasion.  Every year at Christmastime, Buddy and his friend collect pecans and buy other ingredients to make fruitcakes; although set during Prohibition, this includes whiskey, which they buy from a scary—but ultimately friendly—"Indian" bootlegger named Haha Jones.  They send the cakes to acquaintances they have met only once or twice, and to people they've never met at all, like President Franklin Delano Roosevelt.

This year, after the two have finished the elaborate four-day production of making fruitcakes, the elderly cousin decides to celebrate by finishing off the remaining whiskey in the bottle.  This leads to the two of them becoming giddy drunk, and the older cousin being severely reprimanded by angry relatives for letting the younger cousin imbibe.  She runs off to her room crying, but Buddy follows and comforts her with thoughts of Christmas rituals.

The next day, Buddy and his friend go to a faraway grove, which the elderly cousin has proclaimed the best place, by far, to chop down Christmas trees.  They manage to chop and carry home a large and beautiful tree, despite the arduousness of the trek.

They spend the following days making decorations for the tree and presents for the relatives, Queenie, and each other.  Buddy and the older cousin keep their gifts to each other a secret, and although Buddy knows that his friend desperately wishes she could afford to get him a bike, he assumes his friend has made him a kite, as she has every year.  He has made her a kite, too.

Come Christmas morning, the two of them are up at the crack of dawn, anxious to open their presents.  Buddy is extremely disappointed, having received the rather dismal gifts of old hand-me-downs and a subscription to a religious magazine.  His friend has gotten the somewhat better gifts of oranges and hand-knitted scarves.  Queenie gets a bone, as she does every year.

Then they exchange their joyful presents to each other, the two kites, and Buddy's friend tells him that the kite he made is her favourite gift that year.  In a beautiful, hidden meadow, they fly the kites that day in the clear, winter sky, while eating the older cousin's Christmas oranges.  The elderly cousin thinks of this as heaven, and says that God and heaven must be like this.

It is their last Christmas together.  The following year, the boy is sent to military school.  Although Buddy and his friend keep up a constant correspondence, this is unable to last because his elderly cousin suffers more and more the ravages of old age, and slips into dementia.  Soon, she is unable to remember who Buddy is, and not long after, she passes away.

As Buddy says later: And when that happens, I know it.  A message saying so merely confirms a piece of news some secret vein had already received, severing me from an irreplaceable part of myself, letting it loose like a kite on a broken string.  That is why, walking across a school campus on this particular December morning, I keep searching the sky.  As if I expected to see, rather like hearts, a lost pair of kites hurrying towards heaven.

 Adaptations and recordings 

Television
"A Christmas Memory" was adapted for television  for ABC Stage 67 by Truman Capote and Eleanor Perry. The production starred Geraldine Page and Donnie Melvin, and Truman Capote was the narrator. Both the teleplay and the program's star, Geraldine Page, won Emmy Awards.Geraldine Page – Awards at the Internet Movie Database The production also won a Peabody Award. This production is available on video under such titles as ABC Playhouse 67: A Christmas Memory or Truman Capote's "A Christmas Memory". This version starring Geraldine Page was also released in cinemas by Allied Artists in 1969 as part of Truman Capote's Trilogy.

The story was also adapted for Hallmark television in 1997. This production starred  Eric Lloyd as Buddy and Patty Duke as Sook. Eric Lloyd was nominated for a Young Artist Award for Best Performance in a TV Movie/Pilot/Mini-Series – Young Actor Age Ten or Under. This version was criticized as being inferior to the previous film.

The story has also been adapted as part of Short Story Anthology, a 16-part series available from Children's Television International. "A Christmas Memory" comprises episodes 11 and 12 of the series.

Recordings
For the live-audience Selected Shorts series, broadcast nationally on NPR stations, actor John Shea recorded "A Christmas Memory" in the late 1990s. Shea's sensitive reading was anthologized and sold on cassette, and the anthology, Selected Shorts, Vol. XII, was the winner of AudioFile Magazine's Earphones Award in 1999.

A CD of the story read by Celeste Holm is included in Knopf/Random House's 50th Anniversary 2006 printing of the book.

Truman Capote's own reading of "A Christmas Memory" was recorded in 1959 and issued on LP."A Christmas Memory" read by Truman Capote An abridged version of the 1959 LP was featured on the NPR radio program This American Life in 2003. Capote was also recorded in 1976 reading the story to a live audience at the University of North Dakota Writers Conference.

Theatre
In 1991, a musical stageplay adaptation by Malcolm Ruhl and Russell Vandenbroucke, Holiday Memories, was published, which combines both "A Christmas Memory" and "The Thanksgiving Visitor."Holiday Memories review in Chicago Tribune November 22, 1991

In 2010, Capote's "A Christmas Memory" was adapted into a full-length musical by Broadway veterans Larry Grossman (music) and Carol Hall (lyrics). Duane Poole, who had written the original teleplay starring Patty Duke, wrote the musical's book. A Christmas Memory received its world premiere at TheatreWorks in Palo Alto, California on December 4, 2010, starring Broadway veteran, Penny Fuller. The musical had its Off-Broadway premiere at the Irish Repertory Theatre in Manhattan, starring Tony Award-winner Alice Ripley as Sook. It ran November 25, 2014 – January 4, 2015, at the Irish Rep's temporary home, the DR2 Theater in Union Square.

Opera
In 1992, Capote's "A Christmas Memory" was adapted into a one-act opera by American composer Samuel Jones. The opera was first staged by Gaitley Mathews at the Deep Ellum Opera Theatre in Dallas in December 1992, to critical acclaim. The composer fashioned the libretto from the story and the Eleanor Perry/Truman Capote television screenplay, with their personal approval. The composer also created an orchestral suite from the opera.

Sequels
Truman Capote further explored the lives of Buddy and Sook in his story "The Thanksgiving Visitor," which also was adapted for television. The 1967 television production of The Thanksgiving Visitor'' earned Geraldine Page a second Emmy Award. Capote's third short story about Buddy and Sook was "One Christmas", published in 1983, and televised in 1994.

See also
 List of Christmas-themed literature
 List of Christmas films

References
Notes

Further reading

External links
 "A Christmas Memory" readable online
 50th Anniversary 2006 printing which includes audio CD read by Celeste Holm
 A Christmas Memory (1966) at the Internet Movie Database
 A Christmas Memory (1997) at the Internet Movie Database

1966 short stories
Autobiographical short stories
Christmas short stories
Fiction set in the 1930s
Short stories by Truman Capote
Southern United States in fiction
Works originally published in Mademoiselle (magazine)
Random House books